The Quiet Feather was a not-for-profit magazine that served as a showcase for new writing, illustration, photography and poetry. There were nine issues in all, published at somewhat irregular intervals between December 2003 and July 2007. The magazine featured short stories, poetry, travel writing, cartoon strips, lyrics and interviews with writers and musicians. The magazine is published in Cumbria, England, but included work from a worldwide network of contributors and subscribers. Back issues remain available through the magazine's website.

See also
List of literary magazines

External links
The Quiet Feather website

2003 establishments in the United Kingdom
2007 disestablishments in the United Kingdom
Lifestyle magazines published in the United Kingdom
Defunct literary magazines published in the United Kingdom
Magazines established in 2003
Magazines disestablished in 2007
Photography magazines
Poetry literary magazines
Irregularly published magazines published in the United Kingdom